Rien Poortvliet (7 August 1932 – 15 September 1995) was a Dutch artist and illustrator.

Born in Schiedam, Poortvliet was best known for his drawings of animals and for "Gnomes", a famous series of illustrated books with text by Wil Huygen. 

Poortvliet did not attend art school and his family discouraged him from becoming an artist: `My family thought that artists were, you know, a little bit dangerous, all those naked women, all that drinking all night." Instead, Poortvliet's father wanted him pursue a profession that would produce a stable income, so Poortvliet began a career in advertising, initially drawing scenes of families for soap companies. Poortvliet took more pleasure in the work he did on the side for several publishers. He illustrated various books, among them works by Jaap ter Haar,  and Godfried Bomans. He was also a passionate hunter, which led him to drawing various nature subjects.

By the end of the 1960s, Poortvliet was able to make a living as an independent illustrator. To supplement his income, he made a book out of his drawings and watercolours based on his hunting experiences. Later on, he also made a similar work concerning the life of Jesus Christ.

Poortvliet saw himself as a storyteller in drawings. His drawings told the tale, and at most he added a short caption.

For years his works were published by Van Holkema en Warendorf in Bussum, where his "Leven en werken van de Kabouter" (co-authored by Wil Huygen, English title is "Gnomes") went through 59 printings. With the Gnomes series, Poortvliet acquired international fame. This series took on a life of its own, and was turned into an animated series in 1985.

His books have been translated into English, French, German, Swedish, Finnish, Spanish, Italian and other languages.

The Rien Poortvliet Museum is on the island of Tiengemeten in The Netherlands.

Fame and recognition

The general public was delighted with Poortvliet's drawings, but some critics thought Poortvliet hypocritical since he painted beautiful nature scenes while being a fervent hunter. Yet he was elated to be the center of attention.  He did well on television with his goatee, his corduroy trousers and his chequered jackets. For a few years, Poortvliet was a panel member in "Zo Vader, Zo Zoon" (a Dutch game show).

Poortvliet found recognition when Prince Bernhard opened the Rien Poortvliet Museum in 1992. This museum stood in the old, historic Town Hall of Middelharnis, "Fortunately far away from the modern art gang in Amsterdam" as Poortvliet said in an interview. 

Rien Poortvliet died in Soest in 1995 of bone cancer at the age of 63. He was survived by his wife Corrie Bouman and their two sons.

In popular culture 
 Poortvliet is referred to as a "beloved illustrator of gnomes" in the popular cartoon comedy Archer (season 4, episode 12 "Sea Tunt - Part I").

Works
Jachttekeningen (1972) 
...de Vossen hebben holen (1973) 
The living forest: a world of animals (1979) 
Hij was een van ons (1974) 
He Was One of Us: The Life of Jesus of Nazareth (1994) 
Te Hooi en te gras (1975) 
The Farm Book (1994) 
Leven en werken van de Kabouter (1976, with writer Wil Huygen) 
Gnomes (1977)  (20th Anniv.)  (30th Anniv.)
Het brieschend paard (1978) 
Horses (1996) 
Van de hak op de tak (1980) (autobiographical) 
Dutch Treat: The Artist's Life, Written and Painted by Himself (1983) 
De oproep der kabouters (1981, with writer Wil Huygen) 
Secrets of the Gnomes (1982) 
De ark van Noach, of ere wie ere toekomt (1985) 
Noah's Ark (1992) 08-109-1371-2
Langs het tuinpad van mijn vaderen (1987) (about his ancestors' supposed lives) 
In my grandfather's house (1988) 
Het boek van Klaas Vaak en het ABC van de slaap (1988, with writer Wil Huygen) 
The Book of the Sandman and the Alphabet of Sleep (1989) 
De tresoor van Jacob Jansz. Poortvliet (1991) 
Daily Life in Holland in the Year 1566 (1992) 
Braaf (1992) 
Dogs (1996) 
Aanloop (1993) (about man and nature throughout the centuries) 
Journey to the Ice Age: Mammoths and Other Animals of the Wild (1994) 
Kabouter Spreekwoordenboek (posthumously in 1996, with writer Wil Huygen) 
Het Kabouterkookboek (posthumously in 2003, with writer Wil Huygen) 
Tussen gaap & slaap (posthumously in 2003, revised edition of Het boek van Klaas Vaak en het ABC van de slaap)

References

External links
 
 Extensive bibliography

1932 births
1995 deaths
Dutch illustrators
Dutch watercolourists
People from Schiedam
Deaths from cancer in the Netherlands
Deaths from bone cancer
20th-century Dutch painters
Dutch male painters
20th-century Dutch male artists